James Richard Doherty (born 19 May 1948), known as Richard Doherty, is a British military historian and author from County Londonderry, Northern Ireland.

Educated at St. Columb's College, he has written more than twenty books about British and Irish military history ranging from the Williamite wars through to the Second World War.

Doherty's father, J.J. Doherty, a native of County Tyrone and a British AA artillery gunner, served during the Second World War, as did four of Richard's uncles. J.J. Doherty died of cancer, a result of complications from wounds suffered during the war. His mother Anna Coyle, who also died of cancer, came from a nationalist background. His parents married at St Eugene's Cathedral, Derry. Richard Doherty was a Royal Ulster Constabulary reservist from 1972 to 1974 and also served in the Territorial Army. He resides in Prehen, County Londonderry. Richard Doherty was appointed High Sheriff of Londonderry City (2020-21). 

Doherty's most recent book, British Armoured Divisions and their Commanders, 1939-1945, is published by Pen and Sword Books.

Selected works (in alphabetical order)
A Noble Crusade: The History of Eighth Army, 1941 to 1945
Clear the Way!: A History of the 38th - paperback 
Irish Generals in the British Army in the Second World War  
Irish Men and Women in the Second World War 
Irish Volunteers in the Second World War
Irish Winners of the Victoria Cross by Doherty & David Truesdale 
None Bolder: The History of the 51st (Highland) Division in the Second World War 
Only the Enemy in Front (Every Other Beggar Behind): The Recce Corps at War, 1940-1946
The Sound of History: El Alamein - 1942  
The British Reconnaissance Corps in World War II (/)
The North Irish Horse: A Hundred Years of Service 
The Thin Green Line: A History Of The Royal Ulster Constabulary GC 1922-2001  
The Siege of Derry: A Military History 
The Williamite War in Ireland 1688-1691
Wall of Steel. The History of the 9th (Londonderry) Heavy Anti-Aircraft Regiment Royal Artillery (SR)

References

1948 births
Living people
British military historians
People from County Londonderry
Royal Ulster Constabulary officers
Catholic Unionists
High Sheriffs of Londonderry City
Male non-fiction writers from Northern Ireland